The Communist Party of India (Marxist)  (abbreviated as CPI(M)/CPIM/CPM) is a communist political party in India. It is the largest communist party in India in terms of membership  and electoral seats and one of the national parties of India. The party emerged from a split in the Communist Party of India (CPI) on 7 November 1964.  CPI(M) is a part of ruling alliances in three states — the Left Democratic Front in Kerala, Mahagathbandhan in Bihar, and the Secular Progressive Alliance in Tamil Nadu. CPIM has representation in the legislative assemblies of 8 states.

The All-India Party Congress is the supreme authority of the Communist Party of India (Marxist). However, during the time between two party congresses, the Central Committee is the highest decision-making body. The Central Committee shall elect from among its members a Polit Bureau including the General Secretary. The Polit Bureau carries on the work of the Central Committee between its two sessions and has the right to take political and organisational decisions in between two meetings of the Central Committee.

Name 
During its initial years after the split, the party was often referred to by different names such as 'Left Communist Party' or 'Communist Party of India (Left)'. The party has used the name 'Left' because CPI people were dubbed 'rightist' in nature for their support of the Congress-Nehru regime. During the Kerala Legislative Assembly elections of 1965, the party adopted the name 'Communist Party of India (Marxist)' and applied to obtain its election symbol from the Election Commission of India.

Background 

The Communist Party of India (Marxist) emerged from a division within the Communist Party of India, which was formed on 26 December 1925. The CPI had experienced an upsurge in support during the years following the Second World War, and had led armed rebellions in Telangana, Tripura, and Kerala. However, it soon abandoned the strategy of armed revolution in favor of working within the parliamentary framework. In 1950, B. T. Ranadive, the CPI general secretary and a prominent representative of the radical sector inside the party, was demoted on grounds of left-adventurism. 

Under the government of the Indian National Congress party of Jawaharlal Nehru, independent India developed close relations and a strategic partnership with the Soviet Union. The Soviet government consequently wished that the Indian communists moderate their criticism towards the Indian state and assume a supportive role towards the Congress governments. However, large sections of the CPI claimed that India remained a semi-feudal country and that class struggle could not be put on the back-burner for the sake of guarding the interests of Soviet trade and foreign policy. Moreover, the Indian National Congress appeared to be generally hostile towards political competition. In 1959 the central government intervened to impose President's Rule in Kerala, toppling the E.M.S. Namboodiripad cabinet (the sole non-Congress state government in the country).

History

Formation of CPI(M) (1964) 

The basis of difference in opinion between the two factions in CPI was ideological – about the assessment of the Indian scenario and the development of a party program. This difference in opinion was also a reflection of a similar difference of international level on ideology between the Soviet and Chinese Communist parties. The alleged 'right-wing' inside the party followed the Soviet path whereas the 'left-wing' wanted to follow the Chinese principle of a mass party with a class line with national characteristics. Moreover, the faction of CPI which later became CPI(M) referred to the "right" strategy as a national approach of class collaboration, a damning charge within the communist movement, in which the prioritization of working-class interests and independence is considered paramount. This ideological difference later intensified, coupled with the Soviet-Chinese split at the international level, and ultimately gave rise to the establishment of CPI(M).

Hundreds of CPI leaders, accused of being pro-Chinese, were imprisoned. Thousands of Communists were detained without trial.

In 1962 Ajoy Ghosh, the general secretary of the CPI died. After his death, S.A. Dange was installed as the party chairman (a new position) and E.M.S. Namboodiripad as general secretary. This was an attempt to achieve a compromise.

At a CPI National Council meeting held on 11 April 1964, 32 Council members walked out.

The leftist section, to which the 32 National Council members belonged, organized a convention in Tenali, Andhra Pradesh 7 to 11 July. In this convention, the issues of the internal disputes in the party were discussed. 146 delegates, claiming to represent 100,000 CPI members, took part in the proceedings. The convention decided to convene the 7th Party Congress of CPI in Calcutta later the same year.

Marking a difference from the official sector of CPI, the Tenali convention was marked by the display of a large portrait of the Chinese Communist leader Mao Zedong.

At the Tenali convention a Bengal-based pro-Chinese group, representing one of the most radical streams of the CPI left-wing, presented a draft program proposal of their own. These radicals criticized the draft program proposal prepared by M. Basavapunniah for undermining class struggle and failing to take a clear pro-Chinese position in the ideological conflict between the Communist Party of the Soviet Union (CPSU) and the Chinese Communist Party (CCP).

After the Tenali convention, the CPI left-wing organized party district and state conferences. In West Bengal, a few of these meetings became battlegrounds between the most radical elements and the more moderate leadership. At the Calcutta Party District Conference, an alternative draft program was presented to the leadership by Parimal Das Gupta (a leading figure amongst far-left intellectuals in the party). Another alternative proposal was brought forward to the Calcutta Party District Conference by Aziz ul Haq, but Haq was initially banned from presenting it by the conference organizers. At the Calcutta Party District Conference, 42 delegates opposed M. Basavapunniah's official draft program proposal.

At the Siliguri Party District Conference, the main draft proposal for a party program was accepted, but with some additional points suggested by the far-left North Bengal cadre Charu Majumdar. However, Hare Krishna Konar (representing the leadership of the CPI left-wing) forbade the raising of the slogan Mao Tse-Tung Zindabad (Long live Mao Tse-Tung) at the conference.

Parimal Das Gupta's document was also presented to the leadership at the West Bengal State Conference of the CPI leftwing. Das Gupta and a few others spoke at the conference, demanding the party ought to adopt the class analysis of the Indian state of the 1951 CPI conference. His proposal was, however, voted down.

The Calcutta Congress was held between 31 October and 7 November, at Tyagraja Hall in southern Calcutta. Simultaneously, the CPI convened a Party Congress in Bombay.  The group which assembled in Calcutta would later adopt the name 'Communist Party of India (Marxist)', to differentiate themselves from the CPI. The CPI(M) also adopted its own political program. P. Sundarayya was elected general secretary of the party.

In total 422 delegates took part in the Calcutta Congress. CPI(M) claimed that they represented 104,421 CPI members, 60% of the total party membership.

At the Calcutta conference, the party adopted a class analysis of the character of the Indian state, that claimed the Indian bourgeoisie was increasingly collaborating with imperialism.

Parimal Das Gupta's alternative draft program was not circulated at the Calcutta conference. However, Souren Basu, a delegate from the far-left stronghold Darjeeling, spoke at the conference asking why no portrait had been raised of Mao Tse-Tung along with the portraits of other communist stalwarts. His intervention was met with huge applause from conference delegates.

Early years of CPI(M) (1964–1966) 
The CPI (M) was born into a hostile political climate. At the time of the holding of its Calcutta Congress, large sections of its leaders and cadres were jailed without trial. Again on 29–30 December, over a thousand CPI (M) cadres were arrested and detained and held in jail without trial. In 1965 new waves of arrests of CPI(M) cadres took place in West Bengal, as the party launched agitations against the rise in fares in the Calcutta Tramways and against the then-prevailing food crisis. Statewide general strikes and hartals were observed on 5 August 1965, 10–11 March 1966, and 6 April 1966. The March 1966 general strike resulted in several deaths during confrontations with police forces.

Also in Kerala, mass arrests of CPI(M) cadres were carried out during 1965. In Bihar, the party called for a Bandh (general strike) in Patna on 9 August 1965 in protest against the Congress state government. During the strike, police resorted to violent actions against the organizers of the strike. The strike was followed by agitations in other parts of the state.

P. Sundaraiah, after being released from jail, spent the period of September 1965 – February 1966 in Moscow for medical treatment. In Moscow, he also held talks with the CPSU.

The Central Committee of CPI(M) held its first meeting on 12–19 June 1966. The reason for delaying the holding of a regular CC meeting was the fact that several of the persons elected as CC members at the Calcutta Congress were jailed at the time. A CC meeting had been scheduled to have been held in Trichur during the last days of 1964, but had been canceled due to the wave of arrests against the party. The meeting discussed tactics for electoral alliances and concluded that the party should seek to form a broad electoral alliance with all non-reactionary opposition parties in West Bengal (i.e. all parties except Jan Sangh and Swatantra Party). This decision was strongly criticized by the Communist Party of China, the Party of Labour of Albania, the Communist Party of New Zealand, and the radicals within the party itself. The line was changed at a National Council meeting in Jullunder in October 1966, where it was decided that the party should only form alliances with select left parties.

Naxalbari uprising (1967) 

At this point, the party stood at crossroads. There were radical sections of the party who were wary of the increasing parliamentary focus of the party leadership, especially after the electoral victories in West Bengal and Kerala. Developments in China also affected the situation inside the party. In West Bengal, two separate internal dissident tendencies emerged, which both could be identified as supporting the Chinese line.

In 1967 a peasant uprising broke out in Naxalbari, in northern West Bengal. The insurgency was led by hardline district-level CPI(M) leaders Charu Majumdar and Kanu Sanyal. The hardliners within CPI(M) saw the Naxalbari uprising as the spark that would ignite the Indian revolution. The Communist Party of China hailed the Naxalbari movement, causing an abrupt break in CPI(M)-CPC relations.

The Naxalbari movement was violently repressed by the West Bengal government, of which CPI(M) was a major partner. Within the party, the hardliners rallied around an All India Coordination Committee of Communist Revolutionaries.  Following the 1968 Burdwan plenum of CPI(M) (held on 5–12 April 1968), the AICCCR separated itself from CPI(M).  This split divided the party throughout the country. But notably in West Bengal, which was the center of the violent radicalized stream, no prominent leading figure left the party. The party and the Naxalites (as the rebels were called) were soon to get into a bloody feud.

In Andhra Pradesh, another revolt was taking place. There the pro-Naxalbari dissidents had not established any presence. But in the party organization, there were many veterans from the Telangana armed struggle, who rallied against the central party leadership. In Andhra Pradesh, the radicals had a strong base even amongst the state-level leadership. The main leader of the radical tendency was T. Nagi Reddy, a member of the state legislative assembly. On 15 June 1968, the leaders of the radical tendency published a press statement outlining the critique of the development of CPI(M). It was signed by T. Nagi Reddy, D.V. Rao, Kolla Venkaiah, and Chandra Pulla Reddy.

In total around 50% of the party cadres in Andhra Pradesh left the party to form the Andhra Pradesh Coordination Committee of Communist Revolutionaries, under the leadership of T. Nagi Reddy.

Dismissal of United Front governments in West Bengal and Kerala (1967–1970) 

In November 1967, the West Bengal United Front government was dismissed by the central government. Initially, the Indian National Congress formed a minority government led by Prafulla Chandra Ghosh, but that cabinet did not last long. Following the proclamation that the United Front government had been dislodged, a 48-hour hartal was effective throughout the state. After the fall of the Ghosh cabinet, the state was put under President's Rule. CPI(M) launched agitations against the interventions of the central government in West Bengal. 

The 8th Party Congress of CPI(M) was held in Cochin, Kerala, on 23–29 December 1968. On 25 December 1968, whilst the congress was held, 42 Dalits were burned alive in the Tamil village of Kizhavenmani. The massacre was a retaliation from landlords after Dalit labourers had taken part in a CPI(M)-led agitation for higher wages.

The United Front government in Kerala was forced out of office in October 1969, as the CPI, RSP, KTP, and Muslim League ministers resigned. E.M.S. Namboodiripad handed in his resignation on 24 October. A coalition government led by CPI leader C. Achutha Menon was formed, with the outside support of the Indian National Congress.

Elections in West Bengal and Kerala 
Fresh elections were held in West Bengal in 1969. CPI(M) contested 97 seats and won 80. The party was now the largest in the West Bengal legislative. But with the active support of CPI and the Bangla Congress, Ajoy Mukherjee was returned as Chief Minister of the state. Mukherjee resigned on 16 March 1970, after a pact had been reached between CPI, Bangla Congress, and the Indian National Congress against CPI(M). CPI(M) strove to form a new government, instead but the central government put the state under President's Rule.

Land Reform

Though land reform was successfully done in three Indian states (West Bengal, Kerala, and Tamil Nadu), India's first land reform was done in West Bengal in 1967, under the leadership of two Communist leaders: Hare Krishna Konar and Benoy Choudhury, in which Hare Krishna Konar played a leading role in getting surplus land held by big land owners in excess of land ceiling laws and kept ‘benami’ (or false names) vested with the state. The quantum of land thus vested was around one million acres (4,000 km2) of good agricultural land. Subsequently, under the leadership of Hare Krishna Konar and Benoy Choudhury land was distributed amongst 2.4 million landless and poor farmers. Later after 1970 the united front government of west Bengal fail and the land reform was also stopped for 7 years and after left front came in West Bengal in 1977 this land reform was renamed to Operation Barga and this barga was the notable contribution to the people from Left Front Government of West Bengal. To begin with, group meetings between Officials and Bargadars were organized during "settlement camps" (also called "Reorientation camps"), where the bargadars could discuss their grievances. The first such camp was held at Halusai in Polba taluk in Hooghly district from 18 to 20 May 1978. In noted camp two Adibashi Borgaders objected procedure adopted by the official for Barga Operation. They suggested to start it organising people in the field instead of sitting in the houses of rural rich people or the places dominated by them.

Formation of CITU (1970) 

Centre of Indian Trade Unions, CITU is a National level Trade Union in India and its trade union wing is a spearhead of the Indian Trade Union Movement. The Centre of Indian Trade Unions is today one of biggest assembly of workers and classes of India. It has strong unchallengeable presence in the Indian state of Tripura besides a good presence in West Bengal, Kerala and Kanpur. They have an average presence in Tamil Nadu and Andhra Pradesh.

 According to the provisional statistics from the Ministry of Labour, CITU had a membership of approximately 6,040,000 in 2015.

Tapan Kumar Sen is the General Secretary and K. Hemalata is the president of CITU. K. Hemalata was the first woman President in CITU who was elected after A. K. Padmanabhan. It runs a monthly organ named WORKING CLASS.

CITU is affiliated to the World Federation of Trade Unions.

Outbreak of war in East Pakistan (1971–1972) 

In 1971 Bangladesh (formerly East Pakistan) declared its independence from Pakistan. The Pakistani military tried to quell the uprising. India intervened militarily and gave active backing to the Bangladeshi rebels.  Millions of Bangladeshi refugees sought shelter in India, especially in West Bengal. 

At the time the radical sections of the Bangladeshi communist movement were divided into many factions. Whilst the pro-Soviet Communist Party of Bangladesh actively participated in the rebellion, the pro-China communist tendency found itself in a peculiar situation as China had sided with Pakistan in the war. In Calcutta, where many Bangladeshi leftists had sought refuge, CPI(M) worked to co-ordinate the efforts to create a new political organization. In the fall of 1971 three small groups, which were all hosted by the CPI(M), came together to form the Bangladesh Communist Party (Leninist). The new party became the sister party of CPI(M) in Bangladesh.

Boycott of Assembly and Emergency rule (1972–1977) 

In 1975, the Prime Minister of India, Indira Gandhi imposed a national emergency on the premise of internal disturbances suspending elections, legitimising rule by decree and curbing civil liberties. The proposition for the declaration of the emergency and the formal draft of the ordinance were both notably corroborated to have been forwarded by Siddhartha Shankar Ray. The Communist Party of India (Marxist) emerged as one of the primary opposition to the emergency rule of Indira Gandhi. The following period witnessed a succession of authoritarian measures and political repression, which was particularly severe in West Bengal. The members of the CPI-M's labour union became the first subject to political repression and mass arrests while the rest of the members of the CPI-M went underground.

With the initiation of the Jayaprakash Narayan (JP)'s movement, the CPI-M began providing support to it and went on to participate in discussions for the creation of a united front under the umbrella of the Janata Party. Several of the leaders of the CPI-M were also influenced by JP with Jyoti Basu noted to be one of his prominent admirers having worked under him in the All India Railwaymen's Federation during the 1940s. The involvement of the Hindutva movement however complicated matters, according to JP the formal inclusion of the marxists who had undergone a splintering and whose organisation was localised in particular region would have been detrimental to the movement as the Rashtriya Swayamsevak Sangh members would switch sides if they joined. JP and Basu eventually came to an agreement that the CPI-M would not formally join the Janata Party as it would weaken the movement. After the revocation of the emergency, the CPI-M joined an electoral alliance with the Janata Party in the 1977 Indian general election which resulted in an overwhelming victory for the Janata Alliance.

Left Front Government formation in West Bengal, Kerala and Tripura assembly (1977 afterwards)

West Bengal 

For the 1977 West Bengal Legislative Assembly election, negotiations between the Janata Party and the Communist Party of India (Marxist) broke down. This led to a three sided contested between the Indian National Congress, the Janata Party and the Communist Party of India (Marxist) led Left Front coalition. The results of the election was a surprising sweep for the Left Front winning 230 seats out of 290 with the CPI-M winning an absolute majority on its own, Basu became the Chief Minister of West Bengal for the next 23 years until his retirement in 2000. Basu was also repeatedly elected as the representative of the Satgachhia constituency from 1977 to 2001.

From 2000 to 2011, the CPI(M) was led by Buddhadeb Bhattacharjee who remained the Chief Minister of West Bengal for 11 years.

Kerala 

In the late 1970s and early 1980s, two main pre-poll political alliances were formed: the Left Democratic Front (LDF), led by the Communist Party of India (Marxist) and Communist Party of India and the United Democratic Front (UDF), led by the Indian National Congress. These pre-poll political alliances of Kerala have stabilized strongly in such a manner that, with rare exceptions, most of the coalition partners stick their loyalty to the respective alliances (Left Democratic Front or United Democratic Front).

LDF first came into power in Kerala Legislative Assembly in 1980 under the leadership of E. K. Nayanar who later became the longest serving Chief minister of Kerala, ever since 1980 election, the power has been clearly alternating between the two alliances till the 2016. In 2016, LDF won the 2016 election and had a historic re-election in 2021 election where an incumbent government was re-elected for first time in 40 years. Pinarayi Vijayan is the first chief minister of Kerala to be re-elected after completing a full term (five years) in office.

Tripura 
The Left Front  governed Tripura 1978–1988, and again from 1993 to 2018. The Communist Party of India (Marxist) is the dominant party in the coalition. The other four members of the Left Front are the Communist Party of India, the Revolutionary Socialist Party, the All India Forward Bloc and the Communist Party of India (Marxist-Leninist) Liberation.

Leadership and organisation

Leadership 

The current general secretary of CPI(M) is Sitaram Yechury. The 22nd party congress of CPI(M), held in Hyderabad 18 April 2018, elected a Central Committee with 95 members including 2 permanent invitees, 6 invitees and a five-member Central Control Commission. The Central Committee later elected a 17-member Politburo:

Politburo members 

The 23rd party congress newly inducts Ramchandra Dome, Ashok Dhawale and A. Vijayraghavan into the Politburo.

General Secretary 

Article XV, Section 15 of the party constitution says:

"No person can hold the position of the General Secretary for more than three full terms. Full term means the period between two Party Congresses. In a special situation, a person who has completed three full terms as General Secretary may be re-elected for a fourth term provided it is so decided by the Central Committee with a three-fourth majority. But in no case can that person be elected again for another term in addition to the fourth term."

State Secretary

Principal mass organisations 

 Democratic Youth Federation of India
 Students Federation of India
 Centre of Indian Trade Unions
 All India Kisan Sabha
 All India Agricultural Workers Union
 All India Democratic Women's Association
 Bank Employees Federation of India
 Ganamukti Parishad, Tripura
Tribal Youth Federation, Tripura
Adivasi Kshema Samithi, Kerala

International affiliation
Communist Party of India Marxist is internationally affiliated to IMCWP and Unity for Peace and Socialism.
Its members in Great Britain are in the electoral front Unity for Peace and Socialism, with the Communist Party of Britain and the British-domiciled sections of the Communist Party of Bangladesh and the Communist Party of Greece (KKE). It stood 13 candidates in the London-wide list section of the London Assembly elections in May 2008.

Presence in states and politics

 the CPI(M) heads the state government in Kerala. Pinarayi Vijayan is Chief Minister of Kerala. In Tamil Nadu it has 2 MLAs and in the Government with SPA coalition led by M. K. Stalin. The Left Front under CPI(M) governed West Bengal for an uninterrupted 34 years (1977–2011) and Tripura for 30 years including uninterrupted 25 years (1993–2018). The 34 years of Left Front rule in West Bengal is the longest-serving democratically elected communist-led government in the world. CPI(M) currently has three MPs in Lok Sabha. CPI(M)'s highest tally was in 2004 when it got 5.66% of votes polled in and it had 43 MPs. It won 42.31% on an average in the 69 seats it contested. It supported the new Indian National Congress-led United Progressive Alliance government, but without becoming a part of it. On 9 July 2008 it formally withdrew support from the UPA government explaining this by differences about the Indo-US nuclear deal and the IAEA Safeguards Agreement in particular.

Presence in Legislatures, Lok Sabha, Rajya Sabha and local bodies by states or union territories

Andhra Pradesh

After formation of CPIM, CPIM came victorious in 9 seats in 1967, 1 seat in 1972, 8 seats in 1978, 5 seats in 1983, 11 seats in 1985, in 6 seats in 1989, 15 seats in 1994, 2 seats in 1999, 9 seats in 2004 and 1 seat in 2009.
In 2014, CPIM won in one seat, which subsequently went to Telangana state. However, in 2019 CPIM won no seats. CPIM came victorious for many times in local body elections. During 1988 Lok Sabha election, Tammineni Veerabhadram, one of prominent politician of CPIM, gathered 352,083 votes (39.01%), finishing in second place, becoming the most voted CPI(M) candidate up to then outside of the left strongholds like West Bengal and Kerala.

CPIM had MPs in Andhra Pradesh rajyasabha multiple times including M. Hanumantha Rao from 1988 to 1994, Y. Radhakrishnamurthy from 1996 to 2002 and Penumalli Madhu from 2004 to 2010.

Assam
CPIM has a moderate presence in Assam and had run Government in the state once.
CPIM first time entered Assam Legislative Assembly in 1978 by winning 11 seats followed by 2 seats in 1983, 2 seats in 1985 and 2 seats in 1991. In 1996 elections, CPIM won two seats with 1,76,721 votes. and along with Asom Gana Parishad they were in coalition government headed by Prafulla Kumar Mahanta for 1996–2001.  But in 2001 elections, it drew blanks. In 2006, the CPI (M) had won two seats. Ananta Deka, Uddhav Barman represented CPIM from Rangia and Sorbhog seats. In 2011 and in 2016 CPIM drew blanks. In 2021, CPIM made a comeback with Mahajot winning one seat from Sorbhog by a margin of around 10,000 votes. Sorbhog is considered as a left bastion in the state.

In lok sabha from Assam, CPIM first won in 1974 when Nurul Huda was elected in a by-election in Cachar lok sabha constituency in early 1974 by-elections. He defeated the Indian National Congress candidate and former Minister Mahitosh Purkayastha by a margin of 19,944 votes. CPIM had also won 1 seat in 1980, 1 seat in 1991 and 1 seat in 1996.

Bihar
CPIM Bihar has its large roots in the peasant movements by undivided CPI in the state. Communists were actively involved in various movements from the 1920s. All India Kisan Sabha (AIKS) was founded in 1936, which predominantly became active in Bihar. By 1942, AIKS and communists dominated the peasant movement in the country. The members of AIKS or Kisan Sabha were mostly communists. This created a political and social base for communists in Bihar. Sahajanand Saraswati, Karyanand Sharma, Bhogendra Jha were most notable leaders of the movement. Afterwards Bakasht movement (1946–1952), Madhubani movement, Darbhanga movement mobilised Left politics in the state. Though after 1967, neither CPIM nor CPI(ML), which was formed in 1969, grew as an alternative to CPI until the 2000s.

CPIM won 4 seats in 1967, 3 seats in 1969, 18 seats in 1972, 4 seats in 1977, seats in 1980, 1 seat in 1985, 6 seats in 1990, 2 seats in 1995, 2 seats in 2000, 1 seat in February 2005, 1 seat in October 2005 but drew blanks in 2010, 2015 and did comeback in 2020 elections with 2 seats. CPIM fought election in alliance with Rastriya Janata Dal and fared well. It is also speculated that if more seats were given to the left parties, the election could be won with majority.

CPIM had representatives in Lok Sabha from Bihar only for three times: 1999, 1991 and 1989 and each of the time it won only 1 Lok Sabha seat. CPIM also has good presence in the panchayats.

CPIM supported JD(U), RJD and INC to form coalition government in Bihar in August, 2022. But it did not take part in the government.

Chhattisgarh
CPIM registered its first victory in polls in the Chhattisgarh state in the 2019 municipal corporation elections, in which it bagged two wards. Surthi Kuldeep won Bairotil ward and Rajkumari won in Monkre ward.

Gujarat
CPIM has a limited presence in Gujarat. The party never won any Vidhan Sabha or Lok Sabha seat from Gujarat, though a bit number of panchayat seats are often won. But in 2020, CPIM's student wing SFI historically won the elections of Central University of Gujarat, which is considered as a right-wing bastion in India.

Himachal Pradesh
CPIM has the presence in Himachal Pradesh in areas like Summer Hill,  Shimla city, Theog etc. CPIM's student wing SFI has considerably presence in the Himachal Pradesh University. CPIM had representatives in the Himachal Pradesh Legislative Assembly in 1967 and 1993. In 1993, Rakesh Singha won from Shimla seat. Though CPIM managed to win many seats in the municipal and panchayat elections.

In 2012 Shimla Municipal Corporation election, CPI(M) won the posts of Mayor and Deputy Mayor in Shimla Municipal Corporation with a huge majority with a total of 3 seats.

In 2016 CPIM won 42 seats out of 331 seats contested and received solely 2 district panchayats. In 2017 Shimla Municipal Corporation election, CPI(M) managed to win only one seat despite being a kingmaker in previous election.

In 2017, CPIM made a comeback in Himachal Pradesh Legislative Assembly after 24 years by winning Theog assembly seat. Rakesh Singha, a former CPIM Central Committee member won the seat by a margin of 1,983 seats. CPIM contested for 14 seats in the election. After the election the presence in state started to increase.

In 2021 panchayat elections, CPIM increased its tally by jumping to 337 seats. 12 zila parishad (ZP) members, 25 panchayat samiti members, 28 panchayat pradhans, 30 vice-pradhans and 242 ward members got elected from CPIM. Also CPIM candidates got elected for president in 25 panchayats and vice-president in 30 panchayats.

Karnataka
CPIM has not won any seat in Karnataka since 1994. In 1994, CPIM won 1 seat, in 1985, it won two seats and in 1983, it won two seats in the Karnataka Legislative Assembly.

Kerala

Kerala has a strong presence of CPIM and left parties in its politics and society. CPIM had the most of its electoral success from Kerala after 2011. After 2021 Kerala Legislative Assembly election, it historically formed Government twice breaking the 40 year old political practice of the state. CPIM currently has 62 seats in the assembly.

In Kerala, the CPIM has pursued a policy of massive investment in poverty alleviation, including the distribution of procurement cards that provide almost free access to basic foodstuffs and the introduction of a minimum wage twice the national average, as well as in education and health. According to geographer Srikumar Chattopadhyay, "the communists also strongly developed the panchayat system, the village councils that allow everyone to participate in the development of the state."

Madhya Pradesh
CPIM has entered in Madhya Pradesh Legislative Assembly only once. In 1993 CPIM won 1 seat.

Maharashtra
Currently the party has one representative in Maharashtra Legislative Assembly. CPI(M) candidate Comrade Vinod Nikole, an Adivasi leader and CPI(M) Maharashtra State Committee member won the Dahanu by a margin of 4,742 votes. As of 2020, he is also the State Secretary and Thane-Palghar District Secretary of the Centre of Indian Trade Unions (CITU). Notably, the seat was won by CPIM simultaneously from 1978 with just a single exception of 2014.

Manipur
CPIM never won a single seat in Manipur since the party participated in 1995 Legislative Assembly election for the first time in the state. Currently, CPIM is a part of Manipur Progressive Secular Alliance, an alliance led by Indian National Congress.

Odisha

Presently, CPIM has only one representative in Odisha Legislative Assembly from Bonai.

Punjab

Rajasthan
In 2008 Rajasthan Legislative Assembly election, CPIM secured 3 seats from Anupgarh, Dhod and Danta Ramgarh. CPIM along with six other parties formed Rajasthan Loktantrik Morcha in 2013. But CPIM could not win any seat in 2013 Legislative Assembly election. The party made a comeback in the state by winning 2 seats out 28 seats they contested in 2018 Legislative Assembly election.

Tamil Nadu
CPIM, as a part of Dravida Munnetra Kazhagam front in 1989 Tamil Nadu Legislative Assembly election, won 15 seats. In 2006, CPIM was the part of the alliance led by DMK. The party contested in 13 seats and won 9 seats. In the next election, CPIM joined All India Anna Dravida Munnetra Kazhagam coalition and won 10 seats out of the 12 seats they contested. But the party was unable to secure any seat in 2016. In 2019 Indian General election, CPIM won two seats from Coimbatore and Madurai in Tamil Nadu. In 2021 Tamil Nadu Legislative Assembly election, CPIM made a comeback by winning two seats. In 2022, CPI(M) won many seats in the municipal corporation elections. T. Nagarajan of CPI(M) got the post of Deputy Mayor in Madurai Municipal Corporation.

Telangana
In 2014, CPIM won in one seat in Andhra Pradesh, which subsequently went to Telangana state. However, in 2018 CPIM won no seats. In 2022 Munugode by-election, CPIM supported the candidate fielded by Bharat Rashtra Samithi. In 2023, CPIM will contest the election in alliance with BRS.

Tripura

West Bengal

Others
CPIM has a limited presence in states like Goa, Haryana, Jharkhand, Sikkim.

Current seats in State legislative assemblies

State legislative assembly election results

Indian general elections results

1967 general election 
In the 1967 Lok Sabha elections, the CPI(M) nominated 59 candidates. In total 19 of them were elected. The party received 6.2 million votes (4.28% of the nationwide vote). By comparison, CPI won 23 seats and got 5.11% of the nationwide vote. In the state legislative elections held simultaneously, the CPI(M) emerged as a major party in Kerala and West Bengal. In Kerala, a United Front government led by E.M.S. Namboodiripad was formed. In West Bengal, the CPI(M) was the main force behind the United Front government formed. The Chief Ministership was given to Ajoy Mukherjee of the Bangla Congress (a regional splinter group of the Indian National Congress).

1971 general election 
With the backdrop of the Bangladesh War and the emerging role of Indira Gandhi as a populist national leader, the 1971 election to the Lok Sabha was held. The CPI(M) contested 85 seats and won in 25. In total the party mustered 7510089 votes (5.12% of the national vote). 20 of the seats came from West Bengal (including Somnath Chatterjee, elected from Burdwan), 2 from Kerala (including A.K. Gopalan, elected from Palakkad), 2 from Tripura (Biren Dutta and Dasarath Deb) and 1 from Andhra Pradesh.

In the same year, state legislative elections were held in three states; West Bengal, Tamil Nadu, and Odisha. In West Bengal CPI(M) had 241 candidates, winning 113 seats. In total the party mustered 4241557 votes (32.86% of the statewide vote). In Tamil Nadu CPI(M) contested 37 seats but won none of them, obtaining 259298 votes (1.65% of the statewide vote). In Odisha, the party contested 11 seats and won in two. The CPI(M) vote in the state was 52785 (1.2% of the statewide vote).

1977 general election 
In the 1977 Lok Sabha election, the CPI(M) fielded its candidates on 53 seats scattered around in 14 states and union territories of India. It won 4.29% of the average votes polled in this election. The party had won 17 seats from West Bengal, 3 from Maharashtra, and one each from Odisha and Punjab. This election was done shortly after the Emergency imposed by Indira Gandhi and reflected a wide uproar of masses against her draconian rule. A coalition of Opposition parties was formed against the Congress regime; CPI(M) too supported this coalition by not fielding its candidates against the Janta Party.

1980 general elections 
The Janta Party coalition did not last long, and two years after its formation India faced the 1980 Lok Sabha election. This election saw an increase in the vote percentage of CPI(M) and the party secured more seats than the previous elections. The Party had contested elections in the 15 states and union territories of India and fielded its candidates on 64 seats. The party had won 37 seats in total. It won 28 seats in West Bengal, 7 in Kerala, and 2 seats in Tripura. The party emerged out as the whole sole representative of the people of Tripura in this election.

2014 Lok Sabha election 

Nine CPI(M) candidates were elected in the 2014 Indian general election, as well as two CPI(M)-supported independents. This is further down from the previous number of 16. The national vote share of CPI(M) has also shrunk from 5.33% in 2009 to mere 3.28% in 2014. This is a significant 38.5% reduction within a span of 5 years which is consistent with the overall decline of the left in India. CPI(M) did not win a single seat in Tamil Nadu and its seats went down from 9 to 2 in West Bengal where it is being heavily eroded by Mamata Banerjee governed AITC. Kerala is the only state where CPI(M) gained one more seat but this is mainly attributed to the splitting of anti-LDF votes between the UDF and emerging NDA. The NDA saw a sharp spike in vote share in decades which came coupled with a sharp decline in UDF votes.  Thus, it is assumed that the NDA cut into UDF votes thereby facilitating victory for LDF. This was again mirrored during the 2016 Kerala Legislative Assembly election, which saw the NDA getting entry into the State Assembly for the first time as BJP veteran O. Rajagopal wins the Nemom seat and CPI(M)'s Pinarayi Vijayan forming the LDF-ruled government.

2019 general election 

The CPI(M) contested 65 seats nationwide and won three in the 2019 general election. One seat was won in Kerala, where the CPI(M) is leading the state government. Two other seats were won in Tamil Nadu, where the CPI(M) contested within the DMK-led coalition.

Indian Presidential elections

2002 presidential election 
In the 2002 Presidential election, Left Front announced Captain Lakshmi Sehgal as its presidential candidate. Against her was the ruling Bharatiya Janata Party's candidate A. P. J. Abdul Kalam. CPI(M)'s leadership announced that in form of Captain Lakshmi, they were fielding an 'Alternative Candidate'. They said that though it was clear that Captain Lakshmi could not become President because of the opposition of the BJP-led National Democratic Alliance (NDA) and the Indian National Congress to her, yet through this Presidential Election, the Left wished to raise key national issues and make them heard by the masses. Captain Lakshmi herself pointed out that this Presidential election reflected the opposition of the Indian Left to the communal-sectarian politics of BJP, and the Left's solidarity with the religious minorities who had suffered greatly under the NDA's leadership.

2012 Presidential election 
While CPI(M) supported Pranab Mukherjee as presidential candidate in 2012 presidential election, it was in favour of a non-Congress candidate for the post of the Vice-President.

List of Chief Ministers from CPI(M)

List of Rajya Sabha members 

 Bold indicates CPI(M) leader in Rajya Sabha

List of Lok Sabha members

Splits and offshoots 
A large number of parties have been formed as a result of splits from the CPI(M), such as
 Communist Party of India (Marxist-Leninist),
 Revolutionary Marxist Party of India,
 Marxist Communist Party of India,
 Marxist Coordination Committee in Jharkhand,
 Janathipathiya Samrakshana Samithy in Kerala,
 Party of Democratic Socialism in West Bengal,
 Janganotantrik Morcha in Tripura,
 Lok Sangharsh Morcha in Punjab,
 Odisha Communist Party in Odisha,
 Communist Marxist Party (CMP) in Kerala.

See also 

 Politics of India
 List of political parties in India
 List of communist parties in India
 List of communist parties
 Left Democratic Front (Kerala)
 Left Front (West Bengal)
 Left Front (Tripura)

Notes

References 
Citations

Election reports

Sources 

 
 
 
 .

External links 

 
 
 

 
1964 establishments in India
Communist parties in India
National political parties in India
Political parties established in 1964
Anti-Americanism
Anti-capitalist organizations
Marxist parties in India
Left-wing parties
Left-wing parties in Asia
Left-wing politics in India
Anti-fascist organizations
Anti-imperialist organizations
Communist Party of India breakaway groups
Former member parties of the United Progressive Alliance
Recognised national political parties in India
International Meeting of Communist and Workers Parties